The Bedfordshire and Luton Archives and Records Service is a county record office, holding archival material associated with Bedfordshire and Luton. Established in 1913 by George Herbert Fowler (1861-1940) as the Bedfordshire Record Office, it was the first county record office in England. It is located in Bedford.

References

External links
Website
 Search Bedfordshire & Luton Archives & Records Service Archives On-line
 Summary of Archive Holdings

Archives in Bedfordshire
Organisations based in Bedford
County record offices in England
1913 establishments in England